Zinc carbonate is the inorganic compound with the formula ZnCO3.  It is a white solid that is insoluble in water.  It exists in nature as the mineral smithsonite. It is prepared by treating cold solutions of zinc sulfate with potassium bicarbonate.  Upon warming, it converts to basic zinc carbonate (Zn5(CO3)2(OH)6).

Zinc carbonate adopts the same structure as calcium carbonate (calcite).  Zinc is octahedral and each carbonate is bonded to six Zn centers such that oxygen atoms are three-coordinate.

References

Cited sources

zinc
carbonate